Events in 2008 in animation.



Events

February
 February 11: Nina Paley's Sita Sings the Blues premieres at the Berlin International Film Festival.
 February 18: Nickelodeon celebrates the revival of the show The Fairly OddParents with the television film "Fairly OddBaby". It is the first new episode since 2006.
 February 24: 80th Academy Awards: 
 Ratatouille, directed by Brad Bird and produced by Pixar and the Walt Disney Company, wins the Academy Award for Best Animated Feature.
 Peter & the Wolf by Suzie Templeton and Hugh Welchman wins the Academy Award for Best Animated Short Film. 
 February 26: Bratz airs its final episode.

March
 March 14: Horton Hears a Who!, directed by Jimmy Hayward and Steve Martino, produced by Blue Sky Studios and 20th Century Fox, is first released.
 March 23: Futurama returns to the air on Comedy Central after being cancelled in 2003.

May
 May 15: During the Cannes Film Festival, Ari Folman's Waltz with Bashir premiers.

June
 June 6: Kung Fu Panda, directed by John Stevenson and Mark Osborne and produced by DreamWorks Animation, is first released.
 June 14: SpongeBob SquarePants, premieres in Romania on now defunct television channel "BOOM!Smarty".
 June 20: Canadian animation and entertainment studio Cookie Jar Entertainment announces a merger with DIC Entertainment.

July
 July 19: Ponyo, directed by Hayao Miyazaki and produced by Studio Ghibli, is first released in Japan.
 July 23: Cookie Jar's purchase and merger with DIC Entertainment is completed. DIC is later folded into Cookie Jar's operations.

September
 September 20: After 11 years, the Toonami block is officially cancelled by Cartoon Network.

November
 November 13: 3-2-1 Penguins! airs its final episode on Qubo.
 November 21: The Walt Disney Company releases Bolt.
 November 28: The Penguins of Madagascar premieres on Nickelodeon.

December
 December 22: The first episode of The Garfield Show airs.
 December 30: Free Radicals is added to the National Film Registry.

Awards
 Academy Award for Best Animated Feature: WALL-E
 Animation Kobe Feature Film Award: Evangelion: 1.0 You Are (Not) Alone
 Annecy International Animated Film Festival Cristal du long métrage: Sita Sings the Blues
 Annie Award for Best Animated Feature: Kung Fu Panda
 Asia Pacific Screen Award for Best Animated Feature Film: Waltz with Bashir
 BAFTA Award for Best Animated Film: WALL-E
 Goya Award for Best Animated Film: The Missing Lynx
 Japan Academy Prize for Animation of the Year: Ponyo
 Japan Media Arts Festival Animation Grand Prize: La Maison en Petits Cubes
 Mainichi Film Awards - Animation Grand Award: The Sky Crawlers

Films released

 January 1 - Little Dodo (Germany)
 January 11 - The Pirates Who Don't Do Anything: A VeggieTales Movie (United States)
 January 15 - Dragonlance: Dragons of Autumn Twilight (United States)
 January 30 - Fly Me to the Moon (Belgium)
 January 31 - Gnomes and Trolls: The Secret Chamber (Sweden)
 February 5:
 Turok: Son of Stone (United States)
 The World Is Hot Enough (Canada)
 February 11 - Sita Sings the Blues (United States)
 February 26: 
 Barbie Mariposa (United States)
 Bratz Kidz Fairy Tales (United States)
 Justice League: The New Frontier (United States)
 March - The Toe Tactic (United States)
 March 1 - One Piece: Episode of Chopper Plus: Bloom in the Winter, Miracle Cherry Blossom (Japan)
 March 4:
 Davie & Golimyr (United States)
 Unstable Fables: 3 Pigs & a Baby (United States)
 March 8 - Doraemon: Nobita and the Legend of the Green Giant (Japan)
 March 11 - Imaginationland: The Movie (United States)
 March 14 - Horton Hears a Who! (United States)
 March 25 - Tripping the Rift: The Movie (Canada)
 March 26 - Dragon Hunters (France, Germany, and Luxembourg)
 March 27 - 31 minutos, la película (Chile, Brazil, and Spain)
 April 3 - Nak (Thailand)
 April 17: 
 A Fox's Tale (Hungary)
 If You Were Me: Anima Vision 2 (South Korea)
 April 18 - Moomin and Midsummer Madness (Finland)
 April 19 - Detective Conan: Full Score of Fear (Japan)
 April 26 - Idiots and Angels (United States)
 May 1 - Impy's Wonderland (Germany)
 May 15 - From Inside (United States)
 May 16 - Animal Crisis (Spain)
 May 23 - Ghatothkach: Master of Magic (India)
 June 2 - Até ao Tecto do Mundo (Portugal)
 June 5 - Waltz with Bashir (Israel, Germany, and France)
 June 6 - Kung Fu Panda (United States)
 June 12 - Life is Cool (South Korea)
 June 13 - Dashavatar (India)
 June 18 - Urduja (Philippines)
 June 24 - Futurama: The Beast with a Billion Backs (United States)
 June 27 - WALL-E (United States)
 July 8 - Batman: Gotham Knight (United States and Japan)
 July 12:
 Ghost in the Shell 2.0 (Japan)
 Los Campeones de la Lucha Libre (United States)
 July 15 - VeggieTales: Tomato Sawyer and Huckleberry Larry's Big River Rescue (United States)
 July 18 - Space Chimps (Canada)
 July 19: 
 Pokémon: Giratina and the Sky Warrior (Japan)
 Ponyo (Japan)
 August 2:
 Naruto Shippuden The Movie: Bonds (Japan)
 The Sky Crawlers (Japan)
 August 5:
 Dead Fury (United States)
 Garfield's Fun Fest (United States and South Korea)
 August 15 - Star Wars: The Clone Wars (United States)
 August 21 - John's Arm: Armageddon (United States)
 August 26 - The Little Mermaid: Ariel's Beginning (United States)
 August 30 - Kungfu Master aka Wong Fei Hong vs Kungfu Panda (China)
 September 2 - Next Avengers: Heroes of Tomorrow (United States)
 September 4:
 $9.99 (Australia)
 Edison and Leo (Canada)
 September 6 - Tengen Toppa Gurren Lagann: Gurren Chapter (Japan)
 September 7 - Barbie and the Diamond Castle (United States)
 September 9 - Unstable Fables: Tortoise vs. Hare (United States)
 September 12 - Spirit of the Forest (Spain)
 September 15 - Storm Rider Clash of the Evils (China)
 September 19:
 Igor (United States)
 Mamma Moo and the Crow (Sweden)
 September 22 - Bratz: Girlz Really Rock (United States)
 September 23 - Scooby-Doo! and the Goblin King (United States)
 September 24 - Open Season 2 (United States)
 September 26:
 Flying Heroes (Spain)
 Journey to Saturn (Denmark)
 October 4 - Fist of the North Star: The Legend of Kenshirô (Japan)
 October 10 - Sunshine Barry & The Disco Worms (Denmark and Germany)
 October 11 - Genius Party Beyond (Japan)
 October 16:
 Goat Story – The Old Prague Legends (Czech Republic)
 Moonbeam Bear and His Friends (Germany)
 October 17 - Resident Evil: Degeneration (United States and Japan)
 October 23 - Roadside Romeo (India)
 October 28:
 Dead Space: Downfall (United States)
 Tinker Bell (United States)
 October 30:
 Immigrants (United States and Hungary)
 Sing to the Dawn (Singapore)
 October 31 - Kurt Turns Evil (Norway)
 November 1 - The Flight Before Christmas (Finland, Denmark, Germany, and Ireland)
 November 4:
 Barbie in a Christmas Carol (United States)
 Futurama: Bender's Game (United States)
 November 5 - Bratz Babyz Save Christmas (United States)
 November 7:
 Madagascar: Escape 2 Africa (United States)
 Mocland - The Legend of the Aloma (Spain)
 November 8 - Yes! Precure 5 GoGo! Happy Birthday in the Land of Sweets (Japan)
 November 15 - Pattenrai!! ~ Minami no Shima no Mizu Monogatari (Japan)
 November 18 - The Little Panda Fighter (Brazil)
 November 21 - Bolt (United States)
 November 29 -  (Russia)
 December 10:
 Little Spirit: Christmas in New York (United States)
 Mia and the Migoo (France)
 December 12 - Delgo (United States)
 December 13:
 Bleach: Fade to Black (Japan)
 A Miser Brothers' Christmas (United States)
 December 14 - The Tale of Soldier Fedot, The Daring Fellow (Russia)
 December 16 - Unstable Fables: Goldilocks and the 3 Bears (United States)
 December 19 - The Tale of Despereaux (United States and United Kingdom)
 December 25:
 Dayo: Sa Mundo ng Elementalia (Philippines)
 The Missing Lynx (Spain)
 Wanderer in the land of Elementalia (Philippines)
 December 26 - Spike (France)
 Specific date unknown: 
 The Enchanted Mountain (Italy)
 Little Princess School (Brazil)
 Tiny Robots (Brazil)
 Winner and the Gold Child (Italy)
 El Zorro Ladrón (Spain)

Television series debuts

Television series endings

Births

February
 February 11: Ethan Loh, English actor (voice of Peng in Abominable and the Invisible City, Dexter in The Loud House episode "Singled Out").

March
 March 14: Abby Ryder Fortson, American actress (voice of Priscilla in Trolls: The Beat Goes On! and Trolls: TrollsTopia, Neeri in the Miles from Tomorrowland episode "Career Day", Tara in the T.O.T.S. episode "Stripe Out").

April
 April 24: Jack Stanton, American actor (voice of Fun Gus in Kipo and the Age of Wonderbeasts, Bartholomew in Madagascar: A Little Wild, Scout in The Chicken Squad, Penn and Leo in Puppy Dog Pals, Little Bruce in Harley Quinn, Fergie the White Rabbit in Alice's Wonderland Bakery).
 April 25: Asher Bishop, American actor (voice of young Lotor in Voltron: Legendary Defender, Scott in The Angry Birds Movie 2, Oscar in Summer Camp Island, Lincoln Loud in seasons 4-5 of The Loud House, The Loud House Movie and The Casagrandes, Kid at Home #1 and Doomsday in Teen Titans Go!, Wesley in Hotel Transylvania: Transformania).

July
 July 15: Iain Armitage, American child actor (voice of young Shaggy Rogers in Scoob!, Chase in PAW Patrol: The Movie).

August
 August 1: Emma Berman, American actress (voice of Winifred Wings in Go! Go! Cory Carson, Giulia Marcovaldo in Luca, Ginny in SuperKitties, Nash Durango in Star Wars: Young Jedi Adventures).
 August 29: Benjamin Valic, American actor (voice of young Sonic in Sonic the Hedgehog, Spider-Man in Spidey and His Amazing Friends, Natthew in the Craig of the Creek episode "Trick or Creek", additional voices in The Angry Birds Movie 2, The SpongeBob Movie: Sponge on the Run, The Boss Baby: Family Business, Diary of a Wimpy Kid, Turning Red, and Chip 'n Dale: Rescue Rangers).

September 
 September 23: Wyatt White, Canadian actor (voice of Lings in Craig of the Creek, Ari in Elinor Wonders Why, Bozzly in Abby Hatcher, Cody in Total DramaRama, Alex in PAW Patrol, Brad Meltzer in Xavier Riddle and the Secret Museum).

October 
 October 9: Eva Ariel Binder, American actress (voice of young Alex Rose in Super Giant Robot Brothers).

November
 November 23: Asher Blinkoff, American actor (voice of Dennis in the Hotel Transylvania franchise, Minitar in Bling, Young Wolf in The Jungle Book).

December
 December 22: Madeleine McGraw, American child actress (voice of Rita and Patsie in Clarence, Maddy McGear in Cars 3, Bonnie Anderson in Toy Story 4, Young Katie in The Mitchells vs. the Machines).
 December 23: Lucia Cunningham, American child actress (voice of Jessica Williams in Craig of the Creek).

Deaths

January
 January 2: 
Brice Mack, American film director and painter (Walt Disney Company), dies at age 90.
Joyce Carlson, American artist (Walt Disney Animation Studios), dies at age 84.
 January 17: Allen Melvin, American actor (voice of Magilla Gorilla), dies at age 84.
 January 18: Suzanne Pleshette, American actress (voice of Zira in The Lion King II: Simba's Pride and Yubaba and Zeniba in the English dub of Spirited Away), dies at age 70.

February
 February 2: Gus Arriola, Mexican-American comics artist and animator (Screen Gems, MGM), dies at age 90.
 February 6: Phyllis Barnhart, American animator (Walt Disney Company, Filmation, Hanna-Barbera, Bandolier Films, Chuck Jones Productions, Murakami-Wolf-Swenson, DePatie-Freleng, Don Bluth Productions) dies at age 85.
 February 10: Steve Gerber, American writer (Thundarr the Barbarian, Dungeons & Dragons, G.I. Joe: A Real American Hero, The Transformers, Superman: The Animated Series), dies at age 60.
 February 13: Kon Ichikawa, Japanese film director and animator (J.O. Studio), dies at age 92.

March
 March 3: Taichirō Hirokawa, Japanese actor, dies at age 68.
 March 4: Gary Gygax, American game designer and author (co-creator of Dungeons & Dragons, voiced himself in the Futurama episode "Anthology of Interest I"), dies from abdominal aortic aneurysm at age 69.
March 8: Franco Paludetti, Italian animator and comic artist (worked for Gamma Films), dies at age 83.
 March 11: Dave Stevens, American illustrator and comics artist (Hanna-Barbera), dies at age 52.
 March 18: Justin Wright, American animator (Pixar), dies from a heart attack at age 27.
 March 21: Raymond Leblanc, Belgian comics publisher, film producer (founder of Belvision) and film director (Tintin and the Lake of Sharks), dies at age 92.

April
 April 5: Charlton Heston, American actor (narrated Energy: A National Issue, Noel, Hercules, voice of Judah Ben-Hur in Ben-Hur), dies at age 84.
 April 11: Andy Knight, Canadian animator and film and television director (Ned's Newt, Get Ed), dies at age 46.
 April 14: Ollie Johnston, American animator (Walt Disney Animation Studios), dies at age 95.

May
May 3: Ted Key, American animator/screenwriter (Peabody's Improbable History in Rocky & Bullwinkle) and comics artist, dies at age 95.
 May 11: Dick Sutcliffe, American animator (co-creator of Davey and Goliath), dies at age 90.
 May 13: Len Maxwell, American actor (voice of Karate in Batfink, the judge in Hugo the Hippo, Nick Diamond in Celebrity Deathmatch), dies at 77.
 May 16: David Mitton, English television and film director and producer, model maker and special effects technician (Thomas and Friends), dies at age 69.
 May 29: Harvey Korman, American actor and comedian (voice of The Great Gazoo in The Flintstones), dies at age 81.

June
 June 8: Vladimiro Missaglia, Italian comics artist and animator, dies at age 75.
 June 12: Leah Ryan, American television writer (Arthur), dies at age 44.
 June 22: 
 Dody Goodman, American actress (voice of Miss Miller in Alvin and the Chipmunks), dies at age 93.
 George Carlin, American actor, comedian, author and social critic (voice of Rufus in Bill & Ted's Excellent Adventures, the Narrator in Thomas & Friends, Zugor in Tarzan II, Fillmore in Cars, Wizard in Happily N'Ever After, Munchie in The Simpsons episode "D'oh-in' in the Wind"), dies from heart failure at age 71.

July
 July 3: Larry Harmon, American clown (played himself in Bozo: The World's Most Famous Clown, voice of Stan Laurel in Laurel and Hardy), dies at age 83.
 July 22:
 Greg Burson, American actor (voice of Mr. DNA in Jurassic Park, voice replacement for all characters performed by Mel Blanc and Daws Butler), dies from complications of diabetes at age 59.
 Estelle Getty, American actress and comedian (voice of Mrs. Hennypecker in The Sissy Duckling, Aunt Jane in the Duckman episode "Westward, No!"), dies from lewy body dementia at age 84.
 Dylan Beach, American former child actor (voice of Charlie Brown in It's Arbor Day, Charlie Brown), dies from pulmonary hypertension at age 43.
 July 25: Bruce Adler, American actor and singer (singing voice of the Peddler in Aladdin and Aladdin and the King of Thieves), dies at age 63.

August
 August 5: Gary Mooney, Canadian-American animator (Walt Disney Company, Hubley Studios, Gene Deitch, Jay Ward Productions, animated sequence in Jurassic Park), dies from cancer at age 78.
 August 7: Bernie Brillstein, American film producer and talent agent (The Real Ghostbusters, ALF: The Animated Series, ALF Tales, Space Cats), dies from chronic obstructive pulmonary disease at age 77.
 August 9: Bernie Mac, American actor and comedian (voice of Fruit Juice in Lil' Pimp, Gadgetmobile in Inspector Gadget's Biggest Caper Ever, Zuba in Madagascar: Escape 2 Africa, Mack in the King of the Hill episode "Racist Dawg"), dies from pneumonia at age 50.
 August 10:
 Terence Rigby, English actor (voice of Silver in Watership Down), dies at age 71.
 Isaac Hayes, American singer and actor (voice of Chef in South Park), dies at age 65.
 August 15: Carlos Meglia, Argentine animator and comics artist (Hanna-Barbera), dies at age 50.
 August 16: Jack Dunham, American animator and television producer (Walt Disney Animation Studios, Walter Lantz Productions), dies at age 97.

September
 September 1: Don LaFontaine, American voice actor (voice of the Narrator in Santa vs. the Snowman 3D, the Announcer in Fillmore!, FOX Announcer and Narrator in the Family Guy episodes "Screwed the Pooch" and "Brian Sings and Swings", Movie Trailer Announcer in the American Dad! episode "Tearjerker", Movie VO Voice in the Phineas and Ferb episode "The Chronicles of Meap"), dies from complications from a pneumothorax at age 68.
 September 2: Bill Melendez, American animator (Walt Disney Company, Warner Bros. Cartoons, UPA), film director (Peanuts) and actor (voice of Snoopy and Woodstock), dies at age 91.
 September 26:
 Paul Newman, American actor, film director, race car driver and entrepreneur (voice of Doc Hudson in Cars and Cars 3, himself in The Simpsons episode "The Blunder Years"), dies from lung cancer at age 83.
 Walter Bien, American film producer (Tom and Jerry, Rod Rocket), dies at age 85.

October
 October 17: Levi Stubbs, American baritone singer (voice of Mother Brain in Captain N: The Game Master), dies at age 72.
 October 27: Ray Ellis, American record producer, arranger, conductor and composer (Filmation, Spider-Man, Eight Crazy Nights), dies from melanoma at age 85.

December
 December 8: Oliver Postgate, English animator, puppeteer and TV writer (narrator and additional voices in Ivor the Engine and Noggin the Nog, co-creator of Bagpuss), co-founder of Smallfilms, dies at age 83.
 December 11: Madeleine Blaustein, American voice actress and comic book writer (voice of Meowth in seasons 1-8 of Pokémon, Dr. K and Mayor of Bubble Town in Cubix: Robots for Everyone, Solomon Muto and Zygor in Yu-Gi-Oh!, Oslo, Burnt Meatballs, Chef, Audience and King Hungry the Ate in Fighting Foodons, Chef Kawasaki, Waddle Doo, Professor Curio, Tuggle, Gengu, Melman and Biblio in Kirby: Right Back at Ya!, Wally Tusket, Comrade Turbinski and Lord Flash in Ultimate Muscle: The Kinnikuman Legacy, Principal, Police Officer and Chief of Police in Sonic X, Migeira in Samurai Deeper Kyo, Dr. Kureha in the 4Kids dub of One Piece, Overkill in G.I. Joe: Sigma 6, Topher, Sartorius Kumar and Professor in Yu-Gi-Oh! GX, Helga in season 1 of Dinosaur King, Shoe the Shoebill in Impy's Island and Impy's Wonderland, Grizzlepuss in The Little Panda Fighter, Rassimov in Huntik: Secrets & Seekers), dies at age 48.
 December 18: Majel Barrett, American actress (voice of Christine Chapel and Lt. M'Ress in Star Trek: The Animated Series, Anna Watson in Spider-Man), dies at age 76.
 December 25: Eartha Kitt, American singer, actress, comedian, dancer and activist (voice of Yzma in The Emperor's New Groove franchise, Queen Vexus in My Life as a Teenage Robot, Fortune Teller in the American Dad! episode "Dope and Faith", Cool Cat in the Wonder Pets! episode "Save the Cool Cat and the Hip Hippo!", Mrs. Franklin in The Magic School Bus episode "Going Batty", Lioness #1 in The Wild Thornberrys episode "Flood Warning", the Snow Queen in Happily Ever After: Fairy Tales for Every Child episode "The Snow Queen", herself in The Simpsons episode "Once Upon a Time in Springfield"), dies from colon cancer at age 81.

See also
2008 in anime

References

External links 
Animated works of the year, listed in the IMDb

 
2000s in animation